Griveaudia tractiaria is a moth in the  family Callidulidae. It was described by Oberthür in 1893. It is found in Tian Shan.

References

Natural History Museum Lepidoptera generic names catalog

Callidulidae
Moths described in 1893